Makatea, or Mangaia-te-vai-tamae, is a raised coral atoll in the northwestern part of the Tuamotus, which is a part of the French overseas collectivity of French Polynesia. Makatea is one of the only four islands of the Tuamotu Archipelago (along with Nukutavake, Tikei, and Tepoto Nord)  that do not take the form of a typical atoll.

History
 
Makatea is one of the only Paumotuan islands with potable water. Its native name derived from the drinking water being brought out of its dark caves by the local people. "Mā," pure, clear; used here to mean water, "Atea," light of day and "K" for euphony. The other name of the Island was Mangaia-te-vai-tamāe, meaning "Mangaia of the purified (or clear) water."

The island was called "Sagitario" in 1606 by Pedro Fernandes de Queirós who led a Spanish expedition to Terra Australis from Peru. Over a century later it was named "Aurora" by Dutch mariner Jakob Roggeveen in 1722. Later, the Polynesians called it "Papa Tea" (which means "white rock").

There is a ghost town, Vaitepaua, and an adjacent abandoned port, Temao, on the northwest coast of Makatea. These are from the times of phosphate mining (1917 to 1964). Makatea is one of three important Pacific raised coral islands that had large phosphate deposits, the other two being Nauru and Banaba.  The Pacific Phosphate Company Ltd, (PPC), which was founded by John T. Arundel and involved in mining at Nauru and Banaba, formed the Compagnie des Phosphates de l'Océanie with a Tahitian syndicate to mine phosphate on Makatea. In September 1909, a ship owned by the PPC, was wrecked on the reef at Makatea; a bent connecting rod caused the engines to stop and the current carried the ship onto the reef.

Phosphate mining drew hundreds of people to Makatea in the years before the French Centre d'Experimentation du Pacifique (CEP) started nuclear experiments. For over two decades or even longer, Makatea was a very active little island because of the ships arriving to load phosphate and to bring supplies and food to the many workers and their families that lived there.  After the end of the phosphate exploitation, Makatea was almost totally left on its own with only a few families left to guard the island.

The mining  produced thousands of hand-dug holes across the upper plateau of Makatea. An unsuspecting visitor could easily fall into a hole and die while walking in the thick undergrowth that hides these holes. The once active village where the miners lived had a school, bakery, first-aid medical centre, and all the things needed to make life comfortable. All that remains today has been destroyed by time and nature. The school and other places have been levelled to the ground and grown over by vines and jungle.

In February 1956 the United States submarine  en route from Tahiti to Nuka Hiva in the Marquesas encountered the MV Nasarada, under Capt Oto Orbeck, in distress several miles from Makatea at about 05:00hrs. The vessel had nine persons and six pigs on board.  Unable to repair the engine, USS Caiman towed the Nasarada to Pearl Harbor, and subsequently requested permission to enter the harbor at Makatea. Permission was denied by the French. The submarine towed the Nasarada to the harbor entrance and proceeded on to the Marquesas.

Administration and demography
Makatea Island forms a commune associée of Rangiroa commune with 93 inhabitants (2002 census). The main village is called Moumu. The islanders live off agriculture, culture of copra, some fishing and the trade of coconut crabs.

Wildlife

Makatea is the only home to endemic birds, the Polynesian imperial pigeon, Ducula aurorae aurorae, (status Endangered), and the Makatea fruit dove (status Vulnerable), and formerly a range of endodontid land snails.

Flag

The symbolism of the 2:1:2 horizontal triband is as follows:
The top stripe is light blue and represents the sky, the white middle stripe represents the name White Rock (papa tea in Tahitian) and the bottom stripe is deep blue symbolizing the sea that surrounds the island. The red star singles out Makatea within the Tuamotu Archipelago, with its 16 blue-starred flag, and is a 'rocky' allusion to the symbolism of the middle stripe, uniting sky and sea and completing a red-white-blue reference to the French flag.  Mayor Julien Maï of Makatea and vexillographer Colin Randall of Australia designed the flag.

See also
French Polynesia
Nauru
Banaba

References

Oceandots
Map of Makatea
Avifauna of Makatea (Atoll Research Bulletin v.300)

External links
Atoll list (in French)
Classification of the French Polynesian atolls by Salvat (1985)

Atolls of the Tuamotus
Phosphate mining